The E-class lifeboat forms part of the RNLI fleet in the United Kingdom, operating exclusively in the tidal reach of the River Thames in London. The class was introduced in 2002 to serve the tidal reach of the River Thames, which had not previously been covered by an RNLI rescue service, as a result of a much delayed enquiry into the Marchioness disaster in 1989, in which 51 people died. The enquiry criticised the lack of a rescue service for the tidal Thames, and the UK government asked the Maritime and Coastguard Agency, the Port of London Authority and the RNLI to work together to set up a dedicated Search and Rescue service for this stretch of the river.

There are two different versions of the E-class, described as the mark I and mark II. The original intention was that the mark II boats would replace the mark Is, but building of the last two mark Is has been put on hold and there are currently two mark Is and three mark IIs in use, split between Chiswick Lifeboat Station to the west of central London, and Tower Lifeboat Station at Victoria Embankment in central London. An E-class boat also originally operated from Gravesend Lifeboat Station to the east of London, but it proved less suitable for the more estuarine conditions found there and was replaced in 2009 with an Atlantic 85.

Both versions of the E-class carry a variety of rescue equipment including marine VHF radios, a first aid kit, an emergency defibrillator, a GPS navigation system, night vision equipment, a self-righting system, a radar interrogator, towing equipment, and lighting equipment.

Mark I

The mark I boat was an off the shelf design built by Tiger Marine. It is made of an aluminium alloy with a closed cell polythene foam collar, and is powered by two Steyr marine diesel engines delivering  each at 4,100rpm and driving Hamilton waterjets. The maximum endurance at full speed is 4 hours.

Mark II

The mark II boat was designed by RNLI engineers, incorporating experience gained with the mark I boats, and built by Marine Specialised Technology in Liverpool. It has a glass epoxy-resin composite hull with a detachable polyurethane covered solid closed-cell foam collar, and is powered by two Volvo marine diesel engines delivering  each at 3,300rpm and driving Hamilton waterjets. The maximum endurance at full speed is 3 hours.

Mark III

New Delta Power Group RIB Mark III E-Class lifeboat operated by RNLI allocated the fleet number E-10.

Other
The RNLI also had a Valiant RIB which was allocated the fleet number E-01.

Notes

References

External links 

The E-class lifeboat on the RNLI web site

Royal National Lifeboat Institution lifeboats